This is a list of seasons completed by the Miami Hurricanes men's basketball team of the National Collegiate Athletic Association (NCAA) Division I.

Seasons

References

Miami

Miami Hurricanes basketball
Miami Hurricanes basketball